Garry or Gary Jennings may refer to:

Gary Jennings (author) (1928–1999), American novelist
Garry Jennings, English rock guitarist active since 1985
Gary Jennings (athlete) (born 1972), English Olympic hurdler
Gary Jennings Jr. (born 1997), American football wide receiver